DX may refer to:

In arts and entertainment
 DX (album), a 2013 album by Friendzone
 D-Generation X, a professional wrestling stable
 Design Exchange, a museum of design in Toronto
 Deus Ex, a series of video games
 Deus Ex (video game), the first game in the series
 Pretty Cure All Stars DX: Everyone's Friends - the Collection of Miracles!, a 2009 anime film
 Sonic Adventure DX: Director's Cut, a 2003 video game

Businesses
 Danish Air Transport (IATA code)
 DX Group, a British mail courier and logistics company
 Dynex Capital Inc, listed on the New York Stock Exchange, ticker symbol DX
 Sunray DX Oil Company, a former American petroleum company, now part of Sunoco

In science, technology, and mathematics

Biology and medicine
 Diagnosis, Dx or Dx in medical shorthand
 DX (Double crossover) molecule or motif, in DNA nanotechnology
 Digital radiography, in the DICOM standard

Computing and telecommunications
 Developer experience the experience of using a product or service from a developers perspective
 Dx an abbreviation used in relation to DOCSIS
 DirectX, an application programming interface collection
 Double word eXternal, in the context of 386DX and 486DX CPUs
 DXing, in amateur radio
 DX register, a 16-bit general-purpose X86 processor register
 Digital transformation, the use of new digital technology in problem-solving applications

Photography
 DX encoding, a standard marking for 35 mm and APS film cartridges
 Nikon DX format, a sensor/lens format for Nikon cameras

Vehicles
 Albatros D.X, a 1918 German prototype single-seat fighter biplane
 Bavarian D X, an 1890 German saturated steam locomotive model
 DX, a class of locomotives of the London and North Western Railway
 Fokker D.X, a 1918 Dutch fighter aircraft
 New Zealand DX class locomotive, operated by KiwiRail

Other uses in science, technology, and mathematics
 , in calculus, a differential in Leibniz's notation of a variable x
 Direct exchange (DX), direct exchange geothermal heat pump, an energy-efficiency environmental control cooling technology
 Yamaha DX Series, FM synthesizers produced by Yamaha Corporation

Other uses
 510, in Roman numerals
 DX, an emoticon; see List of emoticons
 Delta Chi, a social fraternity
 Deluxe (disambiguation)
 Dx (digraph), in linguistics
 U.S. Dollar Index, abbreviated USDX
 Mario Kart Arcade GP DX a 2013 arcade game and the sequel to Mario Kart Arcade GP and Mario Kart Arcade GP 2

See also 
 D10 (disambiguation)
 DX1 (disambiguation)
 DX2 (disambiguation)